Sean Lewis may refer to:

Sean Lewis (soccer) (born 1992), American soccer goalkeeper
Sean Lewis (American football) (born 1986), American football coach